Sportklub Niederösterreich St. Pölten is an Austrian football club from Sankt Pölten, capital of the Austrian state of Lower Austria. St. Pölten currently play in the Austrian Football Second League, the second tier of the Austrian football league system.

History 

SKN St. Pölten were formed after the dissolution of their unofficial predecessor FCN St. Pölten (formerly VSE St. Pölten) in June 2000.  The new club took over all FCN St. Pölten infrastructure, including the stadium and the Bundesliga junior center.  Although the normal rules state that new clubs must start in the lowest possible division, due to the acquisition of the Academy system, SKN St. Pölten were allowed to participate in the 2nd League West, the fifth level of Austrian football.

In their first season in existence (the 2000–01 season), the team won the 2nd League championship, and were therefore promoted to the fourth tier. In the 2001–02 season, SKN St. Pölten won their second successive title and hence were promoted into the Regional League East. In the same year, they also appeared in the final of the Lower Austria Cup, but were beaten by Theresienfeld.

In the 2002–03 season, the team finished twelfth, but improved the following year to finish in fourth. In the 2004–05 season the club attained sixth place in the league and had a run in the ÖFB Cup which included victories over SV Wörgl (3–0), SW Bregenz (2–1) and a sensational 5–1 victory against Austria Salzburg in the third round. In the quarter-finals, St. Pölten, were soundly beaten by Austria Wien 6–0.

St. Pölten finally achieved their third promotion in the 2007–08 season, going 24 games unbeaten during one period of the season.  They have since remained in the Austrian Football First League, finishing four times in 5th (2008–09, 2010–11, 2011–12 and 2014–15) and three times in 4th (2009–2010, 2012–13, 2013–14).

During the 2013–14 season the club reached the final of the Austrian Cup for the first time in their history. In the final, St. Pölten played Red Bull Salzburg but failed to repeat their stunning third round victory from 2002–03, losing 4–2. However, they qualified for the 2014–15 UEFA Europa League as Red Bull Salzburg had already qualified for the 2014–15 UEFA Champions League by virtue of winning the Austrian Football Bundesliga. In the second qualifying round they played Botev Plovdiv of Bulgaria, winning 3–2 on aggregate after losing the first leg 2–1. In the third qualifying round they played PSV Eindhoven, losing 2–4 on aggregate, thus ending their first foray into a continental competition.

St. Pölten achieved promotion into the Austrian Bundesliga by winning the First League in 2015–16.

Honours 
Austrian Football First League
Winners: 2015–16

Austrian Cup
Runners-up: 2013–14

European record 

Notes
 2Q: Second qualifying round
 3Q: Third qualifying round

Current squad

Youth work 
SKN St. Pölten currently has ten youth teams between for children from the age of 7 to 15, with a total of 150 children and youths. In addition to the junior teams, the club have a second team (SKN II), who play their games in the Mid Western League, with the squad mostly consisting of squad players under the age of 18.

Sponsors 
Under the sponsorship of the furniture store Leiner, the club was known as Leiner SKN St. Pölten until 2005.  With the introduction of staff24 GmbH, the club changed its name in 2006 to SKN staff24 St. Pölten.

Coaching staff

Manager history 

  Karl Daxbacher (2000–2002)
  Horst Kirasitsch (2002–2003)
  Frank Schinkels (2003–2004)
  Günther Wessely (2005–2006)
  Peter Benes (2006)
  Walter Hörmann (2006–2007)
  Martin Scherb (2007–2013)
  Thomas Nentwich (2013)
  Gerald Baumgartner (2013–2014)
  Herbert Gager (2014)
  Michael Steiner (2014–2015)
  Jochen Fallmann (2015) interim
  Karl Daxbacher (2015–2016)
  Jochen Fallmann (2016–2018)
  Ranko Popović (2018–2019)
  Alexander Schmidt (2019–2020)
  Robert Ibertsberger (2020–present)

References

External links 

  

 
Football clubs in Austria
Sankt Pölten
2000 establishments in Austria
Association football clubs established in 2000